Jim Wallhead (born 14 March 1984) is an English professional mixed martial artist who competes in the Welterweight division. He has competed for BAMMA, Bellator, and M-1 Challenge and the UFC .

Wallhead is a member of Team Rough House and Leicester Shootfighters. In addition to his training at Leicester Shootfighters, Wallhead also works as a coach. Wallhead joined Team Rough House after back-to-back losses at the beginning of his professional career and dropped his competing weight from Light Heavyweight and Middleweight to Welterweight.

Mixed martial arts career

Background

Wallhead comes from a judo background, where he holds a black belt. He was introduced to judo accidentally after being taken to a class that was believed to be a karate class. Wallhead was successful early in his judo career for the Beaumont Leys Judo club, before moving to a club in Coventry under Olympic silver medallist Neil Adams. Under Adams, Wallhead won three Under-21s British titles as well as placing 7th in the European youth Olympics.

Wallhead joined Team Rough House in 2005, following back-to-back losses between May and July 2005. Wallhead is still a member of Team Rough House to this date, alongside fighters such as Dan Hardy, Ross Pearson, Paul Daley and Andre Winner.Wallhead also trains Muay Thai with the former multi-time Kickboxing champion Owen Comerie, who previously trained Dan Hardy. Wallhead works his strength and conditioning with Ollie Richardson at the Leicester Tigers Rugby Union training ground. Wallhead also trains Brazilian jiu-jitsu under Victor Estima, he holds a Black Belt under him.

Early career

Early in his career, Wallhead was associated with the Urban Combat Leicester team. He made his semi-professional debut against Steve Matthews on 8 April 2005, in a two-round fight. This fight was fought at heavyweight, at the "Cage Warriors: Quest" event where Wallhead was able to defeat his opponent with a rear naked choke after 27 seconds of the first round.

Wallhead soon turned professional and on 30 April 2005, he made his debut at Cage Warriors: Ultimate Force. Jim fought Leslee Ojugbana, utilising knee strikes from the clinch, whilst preventing Ojugbana from succeeding with takedown attempts. After one-sided striking from Wallhead, Ojugbana gave up his back and Wallhead was able to pull off a rear naked choke for his debut win after just 64 seconds.

Wallhead competed just weeks later and made his second professional appearance against Boris Jonstomp at Cage Warriors: Strike Force. This fight was fought at the lower weight of middleweight and saw Wallhead succeed with judo throw attempts early in the fight. However, Wallhead's ground game was not to the same standard at Jonstomp's and he lost via first round submission (neck crank) after 4:20.

This was followed up by his second consecutive loss, two months later at the Cage Warriors: Quest 2 event, at the hands of Chris Rice. Wallhead was TKOd 3:32 into the first round, resulting in a 1–2 record at the start of his professional MMA career. Following this loss, Wallhead joined Team Rough House after meeting Dan Hardy and receiving an invitation to join the team. Upon doing so, Wallhead dropped two weight categories to his current status as a welterweight.

Early affiliation with Team Rough House

In his welterweight debut and his first fight under Team Rough House affiliation, Wallhead was victorious. The fight took place at Cage Warriors: Strike Force 3 where Wallhead faced Greco-Roman wrestler Steve Singh-Sidhu. Though Wallhead had dropped to welterweight, he still had a considerable weight advantage over his opponent who weighed in at 3.5 kg less than Wallhead. This perhaps was significant as Singh-Sidhu's strikes seemed to have little bearing on Wallhead, who was able to land takedowns and a standing choke. Midway through the first round, Singh-Sidhu appeared to be backing away from Wallhead, who chased him down with punches and knees to the head. After a shin strike to the head, Singh-Sidhu's corner threw in the towel, resulting in a first-round TKO victory for Wallhead.

In December 2005, Wallhead fought Welshman Paul Jenkins. This was Wallhead's first title fight in mixed martial arts, as they competed for the House of Pain Welterweight title in front of Jenkins' home crowd of Cardiff, Wales. Wallhead won the fight via majority decision after five rounds, giving him the title. Just over two years to that day, Wallhead rematched Jenkins in a kickboxing bout (thus not counting towards his pro-MMA record); this time in Wallhead's hometown of Nottingham. Wallhead showed effective low kicks and combinations which earned him a unanimous decision victory.

After his third successive victory, with his win over Henning Svendsen in March 2006, Wallhead made his first title defense of his House of Pain Welterweight title just two weeks later. His opponent was John Phillips who was making his second professional appearance. Wallhead defeated Phillips to retain the title, after a TKO victory due to elbows.

After going 4–0 under the tutelage of Team Rough House, Wallhead then faced Peter Angerer in May 2006. Despite controlling the fight, Angerer defeated Wallhead via submission (arm-triangle choke). During the submission attempt, Wallhead's arm was stuck, meaning he had to tap with his feet, earning the nickname "Scuba Steve" from his teammates.

European and worldwide exposure

Following his loss to Angerer, Wallhead entered the 2H2H 83 kg tournament in Holland, on just 72 hours notice, despite the tournament being at a higher weight than he was adjusted to. In the first round of the tournament, Wallhead defeated Camara Bouna via two-round decision, before defeating Xander Nel in the final via TKO.

Wallhead then captured the Cage Gladiators British Welterweight Title, defeating the UFC veteran Jason Tan.

Returning to Cage Warriors, Wallhead faced the UFC-bound Dennis Siver. Despite being on a three fight winning streak, Wallhead was submitted via armbar taking his record to 8–4. Wallhead faced Lewis Barrow four months later and won via submission (punches) to begin a four fight win streak. Wallhead's next three fights resulted in submission victories; a victory via choke over Jordan James, an arm-triangle choke victory over Soli Clichko and a rear naked choke victory over Steven Lynch.

Wallhead began to gain more recognition and exposure in the United States when his fight against Charles Blanchard was featured on Inside MMA on HDNet. Unfortunately for Wallhead, this fight resulted in a decision loss. Wallhead would later state: "I didn't throw my hands enough in the first round when I was fresh and that's my own fault."

Wallhead then began to show improved boxing and knockout power in his next few fights, the first of which was against Tom Haddock in April 2008 who he defeated via submission due to punches.

Just under three months later, Wallhead faced off against Fabricio Nascimento. Wallhead kept the fight on their feet throughout, preventing Nascimento's takedowns. Frustrated by Wallhead's superior boxing, Nascimento visibly showed his disdain. Wallhead took the unanimous decision victory which was regarded as the most important victory he had claimed at that stage in his career.

Wallhead's next fight came at M-1 Challenge UK in September 2008 and was intended to be against Jason Ball. However, Ball had to withdraw with a knee injury and was replaced by Igor Araújo. In preparation for his fight with Araújo, Wallhead temporarily joined Xtreme Couture Mixed Martial Arts in Las Vegas, Nevada to further polish his skills.  Araújo himself had just finished training at Xtreme Couture and entered the fight having won seven of his last eight fights. After just 79 seconds, Wallhead won via TKO due to punches - the fifth TKO victory of his career.

Wallhead then applied to become a castmember of The Ultimate Fighter: United States vs. United Kingdom. After passing the assessment and interview successfully, he was told he was "too experienced" for the show, though strangely, he was instead made into an "alternate" who would step up if another castmember withdrew with injury.

Wallhead would then have an eight-month layoff. This was due to his signing with the debuting "British Fighting Championships" - an organisation aimed at combining domestic British MMA into one entity - that would eventually dissolve before its premiere broadcast. The knockout-style tournament saw him drawn against the Brazilian Fabio Toldo. However, the BFC organisation would eventually dissolve and in May 2009, the Ultimate Force organisation picked up the fight. The fight saw Wallhead continue to use his improved boxing after an early scare, where Toldo knocked Wallhead down. Wallhead would go on to defeat his opponent via knockout, which was described by one of Wallhead's team mates as "one of the worst knockouts they've seen".

In September 2009, Wallhead won the Clash of Warriors Welterweight title by defeating Marius Buzinskas.

In November 2009, Wallhead scored arguably the most high-profile win of his career when he defeated The Ultimate Fighter: United States vs. United Kingdom participant Che Mills at "Knuckleup At The Manor" in Newport, Wales. The fight, which was seen as "a clash between the UK’s two top unsigned welterweights," was a close fight that was difficult to score for the judges. Mills was able to block Wallhead's takedown attempts and get back up quickly when Wallhead was successful. In the first round, Wallhead was able to take Mills down and get into side mount, though Mills almost won the first round in the eyes of the judges after a late flurry of strikes. The second round saw Mills use foot stomps and elbows from the clinch, which prevented Wallhead from utilising his wrestling. In the final round, Wallhead continued with takedowns before hitting Mills with elbows. With 45 seconds of the fight remaining, Wallhead was able to cut Mills with his strikes.

Wallhead's overall control, strategy and constant aggression led to him taking a unanimous decision.

Bellator Fighting Championships

Despite speculation about joining the UFC, in December 2009, Wallhead was signed by the Bellator Fighting Championships to compete in their 2010 eight man, number 1 contender Welterweight Tournament, which began on 8 April 2010.

Wallhead's first appearance in the tournament was scheduled to be at Bellator 15 against the American Jacob McClintock.

However, on 20 April, just two days before his fight with McClintock, Wallhead was forced to withdraw from the Bellator tournament as he was grounded in England due to the 2010 eruptions of Eyjafjallajökull. Wallhead was replaced by Ryan Thomas.

A month later, Bellator CEO Bjorn Rebney stated that they were aiming to include Wallhead in the third season - despite the absence of a welterweight tournament - with a view to including him in the fourth season's welterweight tournament.

In the meantime, Wallhead took a fight in Cage Warriors against Shaun Lomas and defeated him via rear naked choke in the first round. Due to an injury to Wallhead's previous opponent, Lomas had to step in at short notice, meaning that Wallhead competed at middleweight for the first time in two years.

Bellator's plans to include Wallhead in their third season were confirmed in September 2010, when Wallhead signed to face Ryan Thomas on 14 October 2010 at Bellator 32. Wallhead went on to defeat Thomas via unanimous decision (29–28, 29–28, 29–28).

In the fourth season welterweight tournament opening round, Wallhead faced fellow judoka, Rick Hawn, losing via unanimous decision.

BAMMA
Wallhead made his BAMMA debut at BAMMA 7 against Frank Trigg. Trigg was set to face Tom 'Kong' Watson for Watson's middleweight title, but Watson suffered a back injury forcing his withdrawal and allowing Wallhead to step up as his replacement. In the opening round, Wallhead caught Trigg with a left hook which appeared to hurt him, before executing a successful takedown. He ended the first round landing ground-and-pound shots which opened up a cut on Trigg's cheek. The second round saw Wallhead land the stronger strikes, but less often than Trigg. The final round was also close, though Wallhead once again managed to rock Trigg early in the round. The fight went to the judges, where Wallhead won via split decision (29-28, 28-29 and 30-27).

He competed at BAMMA 8 in a welterweight bout against Joey Villasenor, winning via first-round KO.

Wallhead faced off against UFC veteran Matt Veach in the main event of BAMMA 12 in Newcastle, England on 9 March 2013. He won the fight via submission in the first round.

Return to Bellator
Wallhead returned to Bellator to compete in the season seven welterweight tournament. His opening round match was against Lyman Good.  He lost the fight via unanimous decision.

Back to BAMMA
On 9 March 2013 he took on UFC veteran Matt Veach at BAMMA 12, winning by first round submission due to Rear-Naked Choke. Wallhead faced former TUF contestant Eddy Ellis at BAMMA 13 on 14 September 2013. He lost the fight in a highly controversial decision after breaking Ellis' jaw in the first round and stuffing many of his takedown attempts.

KSW
In mid-2015, Wallhead signed with Poland-based promotion Konfrontacja Sztuk Walki, and faced Rafał Moks at KSW 32: Road to Wembley in a welterweight bout on 31 October 2015. He won the bout via TKO due to punches.

WFCA
On 9 April 2016, Wallhead fought at WFCA 17 against Gennadiy Kovalev. He won the bout via unanimous decision

Ultimate Fighting Championship 
On 27 June 2016, Wallhead signed with the UFC to fight Jessin Ayari at UFC Fight Night 93, replacing Emil Meek. He lost the fight via split decision.

Wallhead faced Luan Chagas on 3 June 2017 at UFC 212. He lost the fight via submission due to a rear-naked choke in the second round.

Wallhead was expected to face Warlley Alves on 21 October 2017 at UFC Fight Night 118. However, Wallhead pulled out of the fight on 14 October citing an injury.

Wallhead was tested positive from an out-of-competition test collected on October 7, 2017 by USADA . On February 6, 2018 he received a nine month USADA suspension for violation for tested ostarine and its metabolite as the result of a contaminated supplement and clear to compete again on July 7, 2018.

Bellator MMA 
In his Bellator debut, Wallhead faced Abner Lloveras on February 9, 2019 at Bellator: Newcastle. He won the bout via unanimous decision.

Wallhead faced Giorgio Pietrini on May 4, 2019 at Bellator: Birmingham. He won the bout via unanimous decision.

Cage Warriors 
Wallhead faced Daniel Skibiński at Cage Warriors 141 on July 22, 2022. He won the bout via TKO stoppage in the first round.

Wallhead faced Mateusz Figlak for the Interim Cage Warriors Welterweight Championship on November 12, 2022 at Cage Warriors 146. He won the tilte and the bout, knocking out Figlak in the first round.

Championships and accomplishments

Mixed martial arts
Clash of Warriors
COW Welterweight Championship (one time)
Cage Gladiators
CG British Welterweight Championship (one time)
House of Pain
HoP Welterweight Championship (one time)
One successful title defense
2 Hot 2 Handle
2H2H: Road to Japan 83kg tournament winner

Mixed martial arts record

|-
|Win
|align=center|33–11
|Mateusz Figlak
|KO (punches)
|Cage Warriors 146
|
|align=center|1
|align=center|1:39
|Manchester, England
|
|-
|Win
|align=center|32–11
|Daniel Skibiński	
|TKO (punch)
|Cage Warriors 141
|
|align=center|1
|align=center|1:26
|London, England
|
|-
|Win
|align=center|31–11
|Giorgio Pietrini		
|Decision (unanimous)
|Bellator: Birmingham
|
|align=center|3
|align=center|5:00
|Birmingham, England, United Kingdom
|
|-
|Win
|align=center|30–11
|Abner Lloveras
|Decision (unanimous)
|Bellator: Newcastle
|
|align=center|3
|align=center|5:00
|Newcastle upon Tyne, England
|
|- 
|Loss
|align=center|29–11
|Luan Chagas
|Submission (rear-naked choke)
|UFC 212
|
|align=center|2
|align=center|4:48
|Rio de Janeiro, Brazil
|
|- 
| Loss
| align=center| 29–10
| Jessin Ayari
| Decision (split)
| UFC Fight Night: Arlovski vs. Barnett
| 
| align=center| 3
| align=center| 5:00
| Hamburg, Germany
|
|-
| Win
| align=center| 29–9
| Gennadiy Kovalev
| Decision (unanimous)
| WFCA 17 - Grand Prix Akhmat 2016
| 
| align=center| 3
| align=center| 5:00
| Grozny, Russia
|
|- 
| Win
| align=center| 28–9
| Rafał Moks
| KO (punch)
| KSW 32: Road to Wembley
| 
| align=center| 2
| align=center| 2:26
| London, England
|
|- 
| Win
| align=center| 27–9
| Rodrigo Ribeiro
| KO (punch)
| Abu Dhabi Warriors 2
| 
| align=center| 1
| align=center| 3:10
| Abu Dhabi, United Arab Emirates
|
|-
| Win
| align=center| 26–9
| Juan Manuel Suarez
| KO (punches)
| CWFC 73: Ray vs. Warburton 3
| 
| align=center| 1
| align=center| 1:49
| Newcastle upon Tyne, England
| 
|-
| Loss
| align=center| 25–9
| Danny Roberts
| KO (punches)
| CWFC 68: Roberts vs. Wallhead
| 
| align=center| 1
| align=center| 4:49
| Liverpool, England
| 
|-
| Win
| align=center| 25–8
| Florent Betorangal
| KO (slam)
| BAMMA 14
| 
| align=center| 3
| align=center| 0:21
| Birmingham, England
| 
|-
| Loss
| align=center| 24–8
| Eddy Ellis
| Decision (split)
| BAMMA 13
| 
| align=center| 3
| align=center| 5:00
| Birmingham, England
| 
|-
| Win
| align=center| 24–7
| Matt Veach
| Submission (rear-naked choke)
| BAMMA 12
| 
| align=center| 1
| align=center| 3:05
| Newcastle upon Tyne, England
| 
|-
| Loss
| align=center| 23–7
| Lyman Good
| Decision (unanimous)
| Bellator 74
| 
| align=center| 3
| align=center| 5:00
| Atlantic City, New Jersey, United States
| 
|-
| Win
| align=center| 23–6
| Joey Villaseñor
| KO (punches)
| BAMMA 8
| 
| align=center| 1
| align=center| 0:48
| Nottingham, England
| 
|-
| Win
| align=center| 22–6
| Frank Trigg
| Decision (split)
| BAMMA 7
| 
| align=center| 3
| align=center| 5:00
| Birmingham, England
| 
|-
| Loss
| align=center| 21–6
| Rick Hawn
| Decision (unanimous)
| Bellator 35
| 
| align=center| 3
| align=center| 5:00
| Lemoore, California, United States
| 
|-
| Win
| align=center| 21–5
| Ryan Thomas
| Decision (unanimous)
| Bellator 32
| 
| align=center| 3
| align=center| 5:00
| Kansas City, Missouri, United States
| 
|-
| Win
| align=center| 20–5
| Shaun Lomas
| Submission (rear-naked choke)
| Cage Warriors 37: Right to Fight
| 
| align=center| 1
| align=center| 2:34
| Birmingham, England
| 
|-
| Win
| align=center| 19–5
| Che Mills
| Decision (unanimous)
| KnuckleUp MMA 3: Mills vs. Wallhead
| 
| align=center| 3
| align=center| 5:00
| Newport, Wales
| 
|-
| Win
| align=center| 18–5
| Marius Buzinskas
| Submission (neck crank)
| Clash of Warriors 7: No Way Out
| 
| align=center| 1
| align=center| 1:08
| Nottingham, England
| 
|-
| Win
| align=center| 17–5
| Fabio Santana Toldo
| KO (punches)
| Ultimate Force: Oblivion
| 
| align=center| 1
| align=center| 3:46
| Doncaster, England
| 
|-
| Win
| align=center| 16–5
| Igor Araújo
| TKO (punches)
| M-1 Challenge 7: UK
| 
| align=center| 1
| align=center| 1:19
| Nottingham, England
| 
|-
| Win
| align=center| 15–5
| Fabricio Nascimento
| Decision (unanimous)
| Cage Warriors: Enter the Rough House 7
| 
| align=center| 3
| align=center| 5:00
| Nottingham, England
| 
|-
| Win
| align=center| 14–5
| Tom Haddock
| Submission (punches)
| Cage Warriors: Enter the Rough House 6
| 
| align=center| 2
| align=center| 3:49
| Nottingham, England
| 
|-
| Loss
| align=center| 13–5
| Charles Blanchard
| Decision (unanimous)
| Cage Warriors: USA Battle Royale
| 
| align=center| 3
| align=center| 5:00
| Kissimmee, Florida, United States
| 
|-
| Win
| align=center| 13–4
| Steven Lynch
| Submission (rear-naked choke)
| CWFC: Enter The Rough House 4
| 
| align=center| 1
| align=center| 1:53
| Nottingham, England
| 
|-
| Win
| align=center| 12–4
| Marius Liaukevicius
| Technical Submission (arm-triangle choke)
| CWFC: Enter The Rough House 3
| 
| align=center| 1
| align=center| 2:52
| Nottingham, England
| 
|-
| Win
| align=center| 11–4
| Jordan James
| Submission (choke)
| House of Pain: Fight Night 9
| 
| align=center| 1
| align=center| 4:09
| Swansea, Wales
| 
|-
| Win
| align=center| 10–4
| Lewis Barrow
| Submission (punches)
| CWFC: Enter The Rough House 2
| 
| align=center| 2
| align=center| 1:40
| Nottingham, England
| 
|-
| Loss
| align=center| 9–4
| Dennis Siver
| Submission (armbar)
| CWFC: Enter The Rough House
| 
| align=center| 2
| align=center| 3:31
| Nottingham, England
| 
|-
| Win
| align=center| 9–3
| Jason Tan
| Decision (split)
| Cage Gladiators II: The Next Generation
| 
| align=center| 3
| align=center| 5:00
| Liverpool, England
| 
|-
| Win
| align=center| 8–3
| Xander Nel
| TKO (punches)
| 2 Hot 2 Handle: Road To Japan
| 
| align=center| 1
| align=center| 2:06
| Amsterdam, Netherlands
| 
|-
| Win
| align=center| 7–3
| Camara Bouna
| Decision
| 2 Hot 2 Handle: Road To Japan
| 
| align=center| 2
| align=center| 3:00
| Amsterdam, Netherlands
| 
|-
| Loss
| align=center| 6–3
| Peter Angerer
| Submission (arm-triangle choke)
| CWFC: Strike Force 6
| 
| align=center| 1
| align=center| 1:49
| Coventry, England
| 
|-
| Win
| align=center| 6–2
| John Phillips
| TKO (elbows)
| House of Pain: Fight Night 5
| 
| align=center| 1
| align=center| 1:41
| Swansea, Wales
| 
|-
| Win
| align=center| 5–2
| Henning Svendsen
| TKO (punches)
| CWFC: Strike Force 5
| 
| align=center| 1
| align=center| 2:06
| Coventry, England
| 
|-
| Win
| align=center| 4–2
| Paul Jenkins
| Decision (majority)
| House of Pain: Fight Night 4
| 
| align=center| 5
| align=center| 5:00
| Cardiff, Wales
| 
|-
| Win
| align=center| 3–2
| Steve Singh-Sidhu
| TKO (corner stoppage)
| CWFC: Strike Force 3
| 
| align=center| 1
| align=center| 3:14
| Coventry, England
| 
|-
| Loss
| align=center| 2–2
| Chris Rice
| TKO (punches)
| CWFC: Quest 2
| 
| align=center| 1
| align=center| 3:32
| Sheffield, England
| 
|-
| Loss
| align=center| 2–1
| Boris Jonstomp
| Submission (neck crank)
| CWFC: Strike Force
| 
| align=center| 1
| align=center| 4:20
| Coventry, England
| 
|-
| Win
| align=center| 2–0
| Leslee Ojugbana
| Submission (rear-naked choke)
| CWFC: Ultimate Force
| 
| align=center| 1
| align=center| 1:20
| Sheffield, England
| 
|-
| Win
| align=center| 1–0
| Steve Mathews
| Submission (rear-naked choke)
| CWFC: Quest 1
| 
| align=center| 1
| align=center| N/A
| Sheffield, England
|

Titles and accomplishments

Judo
Three time Under-21 British Judo champion
Seventh place in the European Youth Olympics
Mixed Martial Arts
Former House of Pain Welterweight champion (defended once, then relinquished)
2H2H 83 kg tournament winner
Former Cage Gladiators British Welterweight champion
Clash of Warriors Welterweight champion

Personal life

Wallhead has a son and a daughter.

See also
 List of current UFC fighters
 List of Bellator MMA alumni
 List of male mixed martial artists

References

External links

 
 
 

1984 births
Doping cases in mixed martial arts
Living people
English male judoka
English Muay Thai practitioners
English practitioners of Brazilian jiu-jitsu
English male mixed martial artists
English sportspeople in doping cases
Welterweight mixed martial artists
Middleweight mixed martial artists
Mixed martial artists utilizing boxing
Mixed martial artists utilizing judo
Mixed martial artists utilizing Muay Thai
Mixed martial artists utilizing Brazilian jiu-jitsu
Sportspeople from Loughborough
Ultimate Fighting Championship male fighters